Martin O'Brien is an Irish journalist, newspaper columnist, broadcaster, media/communications consultant and speech writer. He specializes in religious affairs and is the Northern Correspondent of The Irish Catholic newspaper. He covered the election of Pope Francis for BBC Northern Ireland. He left the BBC on 31 March 2013, having been on the staff for 28 years, and has established his own business, Martin O'Brien Media, based in Belfast.

Personal life
O'Brien was born in Enniskillen, County Fermanagh, Northern Ireland.

He is a graduate in Politics and Scholastic Philosophy from Queen's University, Belfast, and served on the university's Senate from 1982 to 2006. He was the recipient of the The Irish Association for Cultural, Economic and Social Relations Montgomery Medal in 1993 for his Queens University's Master's dissertation on Prime Minister Margaret Thatcher's Irish policy.

He is married with two daughters and two sons.

Career
O'Brien began his journalistic career as a reporter with the Belfast Telegraph. Before joining the BBC, he was Editor of The Irish News from 1982 to 1984. At his appointment, at the age of 27, he was believed to be the youngest daily newspaper editor in the UK or Ireland.

He is Associate Producer and originator of "Our Man in the Vatican" the 2010 BBC (Northern Ireland) TV observational documentary trilogy depicting a year in the life of Francis Campbell, then United Kingdom Ambassador to the Holy See - and its sequel "Our Man in the Vatican: The Papal Visit" which was broadcast shortly after the Pope's visit to Britain. It captured Ambassador Campbell's role in the planning and organisation of Benedict XVI's State visit to Britain.

O'Brien worked as a producer in network development in Northern Ireland from 2011 until 2013. From 1996 to 2011 he produced Sunday Sequence, BBC Radio Ulster's weekly religious affairs and ethics programme, winning four Andrew Cross Awards in religious affairs broadcasting. In March 2013 O'Brien covered the Conclave and the election of Pope Francis for BBC Radio Ulster and broke the news of the election live on BBC Radio Ulster's Evening Extra programme as the white smoke bellowed from the chimney of the Sistine Chapel, ahead of numerous other news outlets worldwide. In an article for BBC News On-Line he reported that the Irish Government will eventually re-open an Embassy to the Holy See.  
Previously he produced Good Morning Ulster and Sunday Newsbreak, winning a Radio Academy Sony Award. In May 2013 O'Brien was appointed Northern Correspondent of The Irish Catholic, a Dublin-based weekly newspaper, a part-time post, and conducted the first ever media interview with an elderly Catholic priest who carries a bullet in his brain from a gun attack in 1974. In November 2015 in The Irish Catholic he conducted the first wide-ranging interview with Mary McAleese since she retired as President of Ireland in 2011. Since June 2015 O'Brien has contributed regularly as a columnist to The Irish News in Belfast and also writes occasionally for The Belfast Telegraph.

References

Journalists from Northern Ireland
Living people
People from Enniskillen
Male non-fiction writers from Northern Ireland
Year of birth missing (living people)